Ceracia is a genus of bristle flies in the family Tachinidae.

Species

Ceracia africana (Mesnil, 1959)
Ceracia armata Malloch, 1930
Ceracia aurifrons Aldrich, 1933
Ceracia brachyptera (Thomson, 1869)
Ceracia dentata (Coquillett, 1895)
Ceracia fergusoni (Malloch, 1930)
Ceracia freyi (Herting, 1958)
Ceracia majorina (Wulp, 1891)
Ceracia mucronifera Rondani, 1865
Ceracia murina Mesnil, 1977
Ceracia punensis (Townsend, 1915)
Ceracia stackelbergi (Mesnil, 1963)
Ceracia subandina Blanchard, 1943

References

Tachinidae
Taxa named by Camillo Rondani
Tachinidae genera
Diptera of Asia
Diptera of Africa
Diptera of Europe
Diptera of South America
Diptera of North America